Aťka Janoušková (March 16, 1930 – March 7, 2019) was a Czechoslovakian/Czech actress, singer and dubber.

Life
Janoušková was born in 1930 in Prague to Rudolf Janoušek, a jeweller. She was enthused by ballet and acting. While she was a grammar school student, her parents were sent to a concentration camp and only her mother returned. During the Second World War she performed at the Czechoslovak National Theatre from the age of eleven and then she joined Disman's radio ensemble. Her mother, Hedvika Janoušková (née Neumannová), married again after the war. Her new husband, like her father, was also a jeweler.

After the war, Janoušková made a living as a clerk-correspondent for some time. Lucerna manager František Spurný brought her to perform at domestic and foreign shows. For example, she worked with Eman Fiala on a cabaret. She was able to perform in German and French films. From 1981 to 1989 she performed at the National Theatre in the role of Barbara in the opera Zuzana Vojířová . In 1983 she was in the TV film of Zuzana Vojirova.

In 2009 she received the František Filipovský Award for her long work dubbing films. She was particularly known for her work dubbing animated films for children. She was known particularly as Maya the Bee.

Janoušková died in Strašnice in 2019. She had been living alone and had few visitors.

Filmography

References

1930 births
2019 deaths
Actresses from Prague
Czechoslovak women singers